The J.A. Bookman General Store, on Main Street in Ingomar, Montana, was built in 1921.  It was listed on the National Register of Historic Places in 1994.

It was one of only two surviving brick buildings in Ingomar.  It has two single-bay commercial storefronts, topped by a parapet wall.

It was deemed historically significant for its association with early twentieth-century patterns of trade and commerce in Ingomar and Rosebud County. As with most small towns in eastern Montana, Ingomar existed primarily as a retail trade center for farm and ranch settlers in the immediate vicinity. The town's small business district was a focal of retail (and, consequently, social) activity for both the community and
the surrounding countryside. The Bookman Store was, in turn, a primary element in Ingomar's business life. For nearly thirty years, J.A. Bookman General Store was the largest mercantile in Ingomar, and a centerpiece of the town's commercial district. The store's importance and prosperity is attested to by the building's relatively large size, substantial construction, and prominent location.

References

National Register of Historic Places in Rosebud County, Montana
Buildings and structures completed in 1921
1921 establishments in Montana
Commercial buildings on the National Register of Historic Places in Montana